Vénutia-Ludivine Dubé Reding (born 6 February 1997), professionally known as Ludivine Reding, is an actress from Montreal, Canada. She played Fanny Couture in the television series Fugueuse. Her father is a Belgian immigrant and her mother is from Canada.

References

External links 
 

Actresses from Montreal
Canadian film actresses
Canadian people of Belgian descent
Canadian television actresses
French Quebecers
21st-century Canadian actresses
Living people
1997 births